Lawrence Francis Probst III (born June 3, 1950) is an American businessman who is best known for his work with the  video game publisher Electronic Arts, including acting as CEO from 1991 until 2007 and as executive chairman from 2013–14. He remains chairman of EA and served as chairman of the United States Olympic Committee until 2019.

Life
Probst was born on July 6, 1950. He is the son of Ruth (née Gallagher) and Lawrence Francis Probst II. He and his wife Nancy have two sons. He earned a bachelor's degree from the University of Delaware.

Entertainment career
Probst worked for Johnson & Johnson and Clorox before being recruited into the video game industry through Activision in 1982. Two years later he joined EA as vice president for sales until 1986. He then took on the role of the company's senior vice president of the publishing division from 1986–90. He was promoted to president of Electronic Arts in 1990, remaining in that position until 1997. During this time, he was also pronounced CEO of Electronic Arts in 1991, which he held onto until April 2007. Next Generation named his one of the "75 Most Important People in the Games Industry of 1995", remarking that "Probst may not be as colorful a character as his predecessor [ Trip Hawkins], but he does seem adept at combining the freedom and daring of creativity with the restraints and common sense of a commercial operation."

When president and chief operating officer John Riccitiello resigned in April 2004, Probst became his successor. Riccitiello was re-hired as CEO in 2007, he retained his non-operational duties as chairman. He then worked as executive chairman of Electronic Arts Inc. from March 18, 2013, to January 1, 2015, and former chief executive officer of the company.

According to EA's 2005 Annual Report, Probst is the biggest individual shareholder in EA, owning 739,761 shares and the right to acquire a further 3.1 million, which combined accounts for 1.2 percent of the company.  Probst sits on the boards of two cancer research groups: the V Foundation and ABC2.

In addition to his work at Electronic Arts, Probst also served as the chairman of Digital Entertainment Corporation of America.

Olympic career
In 2008, he was made the U.S. Olympic Committee chairman of the board. Five years after his appointment as chairman of the USOC, Probst was elected as an IOC member at the 125th IOC Session in Buenos Aires in September 2013. Probst worked with many other IOC groups as well. Probst has served on the IOC International Relations and the IOC Radio and Television Commissions. He assumed the position of  chair of the IOC Press Commission in 2014. At the end of 2018 Probst retired from his IOC and USOC positions.

References

External links
EA Company Bios: Larry Probst
"John Riccitiello resigns as EA President" article from CNNMoney
ELECTRONIC ARTS / On the record: Larry Probst from SFGate.com

1951 births
Living people
American chairpersons of corporations
American technology chief executives
University of Delaware alumni
Electronic Arts employees
International Olympic Committee members
Johnson & Johnson people
Businesspeople from Delaware
Video game businesspeople
Presidents of the United States Olympic Committee